Rouhia or Er-Rouhia is a town and commune in the Siliana Governorate, Tunisia. In 2004, it had a population of 4,307.

See also
List of cities in Tunisia

References

Populated places in Tunisia
Communes of Tunisia